Francis Vernon Douglas (22 May 1910 –  July 1943) was a New Zealand priest of the Missionary Society of St. Columban who was killed in the Philippines by Japanese soldiers in 1943.

Biography
He was born in Johnsonville, in Wellington, the fifth of eight children (five sons and three daughters) of Kathleen (née Gaffney) and George Charles Douglas, an Australian-born railway worker. His mother was a devout Catholic from County Sligo, Ireland, and his father became a Catholic in 1926.

Douglas trained for the Catholic priesthood at Holy Cross Seminary, Mosgiel. Within a few months of his ordination, at the end of 1934, he applied to join the Missionary Society of St. Columban. He was curate at New Plymouth when he left to join the society at the start of 1937. He was appointed to the Philippines in July 1939. He was posted to Pililla. Five years later during the Japanese occupation he was taken by secret police looking for information on guerrillas active in his area.

Over three days in the Church of Saint James the Apostle in Paete, Laguna, he was beaten and tortured, the presumption being that police were trying to extort information from him about guerrillas whose confessions he may have heard. He remained silent and on 27 July 1943, very weak but still conscious, was put on a truck with a guard of Japanese soldiers. He was never seen again. He is remembered in the name of a boys college in New Plymouth, Francis Douglas Memorial College.

Beatification
In collaboration with the Roman Catholic Archdiocese of Wellington, the Columban Missionaries are preparing the steps in opening Douglas' cause for sainthood. He is honored for his steadfast devotion to his religious duties, and stands with Mother Mary Joseph Aubert and Emmet McHardy as one of the New Zealand Catholic Church’s three models of sanctity.

Notes

Further reading
 Father Francis Douglas, Francis Douglas Memorial College, New Plymouth website (retrieved 18 February 2011)
 Michael King,God's Farthest Outpost: A History of Catholics in New Zealand, Penguin Book Auckland, 1998.
 Patricia Brookes,With No Regrets: The Story of Francis Vernon Douglas, Claretian Publications, Quezon City, Philippines, 1998.
 Michael O'Meeghan, Steadfast in Hope: The Story of the Catholic Archdiocese of Wellington 1850-200, Dunmore Press, Palmerston North, 2011

1910 births
1943 deaths
New Zealand people of Irish descent
New Zealand people of Australian descent
20th-century New Zealand Roman Catholic priests
New Zealand Roman Catholic missionaries
People from Wellington City
Holy Cross College, New Zealand alumni
Roman Catholic missionaries in the Philippines
Missionary Society of St. Columban
20th-century Roman Catholic martyrs
New Zealand expatriates in the Philippines
Date of death unknown
20th-century venerated Christians
New Zealand war casualties
People executed by Japanese occupation forces
Civilians killed in World War II